HD 20468 is a class K2II (orange bright giant) star in the constellation Perseus. Its apparent magnitude is 4.82 and it is approximately 1180 light years away based on parallax.

References

Perseus (constellation)
K-type bright giants
BD+33 619
015416
0991
020468